Stories is the title of a compilation CD by Randy Stonehill, released in 1993 on Myrrh Records. 

All of the tracks were released on previous albums by Stonehill (some of which remain unavailable on CD to this day), except "I Thirst For You," "Charlie the Weatherman," and the Acoustic Version of "Hope of Glory." These new tracks were recorded at The Green Room, with the Lost Dogs and Terry Scott Taylor producing. 

"This record is dedicated with love to the memory of John Mark Heard, who always told the true story."

Track listing
All songs written by Randy Stonehill except as otherwise noted.

Side one
 "I Thirst For You"  – 5:49
 "Still, Small Voice"  – 4:06 (from Celebrate This Heartbeat)
 "Rachel Delevoryas"  – 3:19 (from Wonderama)
 "Bells"  – 4:15 (from Love Beyond Reason)
 "Starlings"  – 5:01 (from Return to Paradise)
 "Turning Thirty"  – 3:46 (from Equator)
 "Coming Back Soon"  – 4:46 (from Can't Buy a Miracle)

Side two
 "Charlie the Weatherman" (Randy Stonehill, Terry Scott Taylor) – 5:54
 "Sing in Portuguese"  – 4:05 (from Wonderama)
 "Weight of the Sky"  – 3:28 (from Return to Paradise)
 "Letter to My Family"  – 4:35 (from Between the Glory and the Flame)
 "Christmas at Denny's"  – 5:53 (from Return to Paradise)
 "Hope of Glory" (Acoustic Version)  – 4:22 (original version from The Wild Frontier)

Personnel 
On "I Thirst for You" and "Charlie the Weatherman"
 Randy Stonehill with Lost Dogs (Terry Scott Taylor, Gene Eugene, Derri Daugherty and Mike Roe)
 Rob Watson – keyboards
 Greg Kellogg – pedal steel guitar on "Charlie the Weatherman"
 Burleigh Drummond – drums, percussion 
 Randy Stonehill, Derry Daugherty and Riki Michele – backing vocals

Production 
 "I Thirst For You", "Charlie The Weatherman" and "Hope of Glory" produced by Terry Taylor.
 Executive Producer – Mark Maxwell
 Recorded by Gene Eugene
 Additional engineering by Drew Aldridge
 Recorded at the Green Room (Huntington Beach, California).
 Mastered by Steve Hall at Future Disc (North Hollywood, California).

References

1993 compilation albums
Randy Stonehill albums